Ephraim Mganda Chiume (born 1953) is a politician who was appointed Minister of Foreign Affairs in April 2012 in the cabinet of Malawi (until 2014). He was formerly Deputy Minister of Natural Resources, Energy and Environment, and then served as Justice Minister (2011 to 2012).

Chiume was born in 1953. He obtained a BSc Degree in Quantity Surveying from the University of South West in the United Kingdom. He is a member of the Royal Institution of Chartered Surveyors in the UK, and the Surveyors Institute of Malawi. 
He worked for Brendan Penny Associates, Bristol in the UK, and Peter Richards & Partners in Zambia, Botswana and Malawi.
Chiume established his own consultancy of Chartered Quantity Surveyors in Lilongwe.

Chiume joined the Democratic Progressive Party (DPP) and became the party's  Administrative Secretary. From 2008 he was a member of the DPP Governing Council. On 19 May 2009, he was elected Member of Parliament for Nkhatabay North Constituency on the DPP ticket.
He was appointed Deputy Minister of Natural Resources and Energy in the cabinet that became effective on 15 June 2009.
He was confirmed as Deputy Minister of Natural Resources, Energy and Environment in the reshuffle announced on 9 August 2010.

References

1953 births
Living people
Government ministers of Malawi
Democratic Progressive Party (Malawi) politicians